Bishop George (secular name Paul Macarius Schaefer; May 25, 1950, Belleville, Illinois) is bishop of the Russian Orthodox Church Outside of Russia, bishop of Canberra, vicar of the Australian and New Zealand Diocese, and former abbot of the Holy Cross Monastery in Wayne, West Virginia.

Biography

Early life
Paul Schaefer was born on May 25, 1950, in Belleville, Illinois to Francis and Claire Schaefer, a devout Catholic family of German descent. While attending a Roman Catholic elementary school, he attended mass daily, served as an altar boy and sang in the church choir.

In 1968 he graduated from Catholic High School and then attended Southern Illinois University from 1968 to 1972.

After graduating, he saw problems in the Roman Catholic Church; he stopped attending services and began to search for the truth, including in Buddhist and other eastern sources.

In 1974, he moved to San Jose, California, and found out about Orthodox Christianity through a Greek man, discovering the Eastern Orthodox Church. He was baptised that year at the Greek Orthodox Church in Modesto, California, and given the name Makarios (or Macarius) in honor of Saint Macarius the Great. He started attending St. Nicholas Church, San Jose, before attending the Greek Cathedral in San Francisco. as well as a Russian church.

His brother, Rev. Edward Schaefer, is a Catholic priest serving in the Diocese of Belleville, IL.

Monastic life
In January 1975, Makarios visited Mount Athos, where he decided to become a monk. He later visited the St. Herman of Alaska Monastery, Platina, California, where he met Seraphim (Rose) and Herman (Podmoshensky) and was immersed in the monastic life. They suggested he enrol in seminary, which he did, entering Holy Trinity Orthodox Seminary in September 1975.

On Christmas, January 7, 1976, Makarios was made a novice by Archbishop Averky (Taushev). As a novice his obediences in the monastery were working in the farm and cemetery.

He spent the next summer in Platina, California, and helped  Fr. Seraphim and Fr. Herman to print books and do other jobs. Divine services were in English unlike Jordanville: "I understood every word, which touched my heart".

On Friday of the First Week of Lent, 1979, after a few years in the monastery he was tonsured a rassophore monk. On Friday of the First Week of Lent, 1980, he was tonsured into the small schema and given the name Mitrophan in honor of Saint Mitrophan of Voronezh. On Palm Sunday of the same year he was ordained a subdeacon and a couple of months thereafter he graduated from Holy Trinity Seminary.

In June 1981 he was given a blessing by Archbishop Laurus (Škurla) to relocate to Mount Athos. Initially, he lived in Skete of Prophet Elijah for several months, a strict skete which was then connected with ROCOR.

On the advice of elder Nicodemus of Karoulia, he then moved to an English-speaking cell within Koutloumousiou monastery with four other ROCOR monks, which was one that other monasteries would often send American visitors to. He became acquainted with St. Paisios the Athonite while there. He was tonsured to the great schema by hieromonk Chrysostomos of Koutloumousiou and given the name George in honor of Saint George the Great-Martyr.

In February, 1986 he returned to Holy Trinity Monastery and started working on the Print Shop of Saint Job of Pochaev in 1986, where he worked until 1998. He assumed editorial duties on "Orthodox Life" from 1992 to his consecration as bishop in 2008.

On the feast of St. Michael, 1986 he was ordained a hierodeacon. On Palm Sunday, 1987 he was ordained a hieromonk.

In 1994 he was appointed as economos Holy Trinity Monastery.

In September 1998 he was elevated to the rank of hegumen.

On September 5, 2005, at the Holy Trinity Monastery in Jordanville, during the celebration of the 75th anniversary of the monastery, Metropolitan Laurus (Škurla) elevated him to the rank of archimandrite.

He is the author of several articles and translations published in "Orthodox Life". He translated several sayings of the Optina Elders published in the book "Living Without Hypocrisy", published in 2006 by Holy Trinity Monastery Press. He also served as confessor and spiritual father of the Hermitage of the Holy Cross in Wayne, West Virginia, the largest English-language monastery of the Russian Orthodox Church Outside of Russia.

Life as a Bishop

On May 15, 2008, the Council of Bishops of the ROCOR decreed to send the curricula vitae of archimandrite George (Schaefer) and protopriest John Shaw along with accompanying appeals to Patriarch Alexius II of Moscow and All Russia for the confirmation of their candidacies for episcopal consecration. The Holy Synod of the Russian Orthodox Church confirmed their election (together with previously elected archimandrite Theodosius (Ivashchenko)) on June 23, 2008. Archimandrite George, having no internet, found out about his appointment from the congratulations of friends.

On December 7, 2008, Archimandrite George was consecrated bishop at Holy Trinity Monastery in Jordanville, New York, by Bishop Gabriel (Chemodakov) of Montreal and Canada, Bishop Peter (Loukianoff) of Cleveland and Bishop John (Bērziņš) of Caracas, receiving the title of Bishop of Mayfield. Metropolitan Hilarion (Kapral), the vicar of whom he became, could not be present, as was preparing to attend the funeral of Patriarch Alexius II in Russia.

Bishop George's place of residence was then at the Hermitage of the Holy Cross in Wayne, West Virginia. On May 7, 2009, he was elected abbot of the Holy Cross Monastery in Wayne, WV.

Synod of Bishops of ROCOR on May 5–7, 2009 decided to form a commission to study the relationship with the Orthodox Church in America and to hold joint meetings to discuss the sources of the division between the Russian Orthodox Church Outside of Russia and the American Metropoliate; bishop George became its president; also Synod of Bishops decided to reassign the Holy Cross Hermitage, which formerly was an affiliated monastery (a podvorie) of the Holy Trinity Monastery, to Eastern American Diocese, entrusting with arranging for the election of its abbot". The month bishop George was elected abbot of Holy Cross Monastery by its brethren.

May 25, 2010 in consideration of his labour for the Church and of 60th anniversary he was awarded the Order of St. Seraphim of Sarov, II degree.

On January 27, 2013, at St. Nicholas Cathedral in Washington he attended the enthronement of Metropolitan of All America and Canada Tikhon.

In June 2013 he was sent by Metropolitan Hilarion to Australian and New Zealand Diocese in place of metropolitan Hilarion and to celebrate the divine services in our churches, especially those that will be celebrating their parish feast days.

On October 7, 2014, he was appointed vicar of First-Hierarch metropolitan Hilarion for Australian and New Zealand Diocese with title bishop of Canberra.

On 21 September, 2022, the Council of Bishops of the Russian Orthodox Church Outside of Russia, during deliberations on the expansion of the episcopacy and clergy, appointed Bishop George of Canberra Ruling Bishop of the Diocese of Australia and New Zealand with the title "of Sydney, Australia and New Zealand".

References

External links
 Biography of Bishop George
 Archimandrite George's Speech at his nomination as bishop of Mayfield
 Interview with Newly Consecrated ROCOR Bishop George (Schaefer) of Mayfield, Jordanville, NY, 2008
 Георгий, епископ Мейфильдский (РПЦЗ), викарий Восточно-Американской епархии (Шейфер Макарий)
 Bishop George of Mayfield: “Church Life Isn't Black and White”

American expatriates in Australia
American people of German descent
Bishops of the Russian Orthodox Church Outside of Russia
Living people
1950 births
Converts to Eastern Orthodoxy from Roman Catholicism
People from Belleville, Illinois
People associated with Mount Athos
People associated with Pantokratoros Monastery
People associated with Koutloumousiou Monastery